The 2016 Kerrick Sports Sedan Series was an Australian motor racing competition sanctioned by the Confederation of Australian Motor Sport. There were three different classes, Class SS for Group 3D Sports Sedan, Class TA for Trans Am cars and Class M for cars produced by MARC Cars Australia.

The series was won by Tony Ricciardello.

Teams and drivers

Race calendar 
The series was contested over five rounds, each consisting of three races.

Series standings

References

External links
  Natsoft Race Results at racing.natsoft.com.au > Circuit Racing > Year = 2016

Kerrick Sports Sedans Series
National Sports Sedan Series